William Ervin "Dick" Risenhoover Jr. (February 15, 1927 – April 8, 1978) was the sportscaster for the Texas Rangers from 1972 to 1977.

Early life, education and army service
He attended Childress High School. He served in the United States Army from July 1945 to January 1947, where he played on the baseball team for Fort MacArthur, California. He played baseball and basketball at the University of Texas at Austin, where he graduated in 1950 and was on the 1950 Texas Longhorns baseball team. He died of liver cancer at the age of 51.

References

External links
Mike Shannon's "Profile:  Dick Risenhoover"

1927 births
1978 deaths
20th-century American journalists
American male journalists
American sports announcers
Borger Gassers players
Deaths from cancer in Texas
Major League Baseball broadcasters
Minor League Baseball broadcasters
People from Childress, Texas
Texas Longhorns baseball players
Texas Rangers (baseball) announcers
United States Army soldiers
American military sports players